Dylan Mabin (born September 14, 1997) is an American football cornerback for the Atlanta Falcons of the National Football League (NFL). He played college football at Fordham.

College career
Mabin was a member of the Fordham Rams for four seasons. Mabin finished his collegiate career with 149 total tackles, 6.5 tackles for loss, two forced fumbles and a fumble recovery with one interception and 40 passes defend in 42 games played and also returned 49 kickoffs for 1,082 yards and one touchdown.

Professional career

Oakland / Las Vegas Raiders
Mabin was signed by the Oakland Raiders as an undrafted free agent on April 29, 2019. He was waived during final roster cuts and was signed to the team's practice squad on September 1, 2019. Mabin was placed on the practice squad/injured list on December 10, 2019.

After the season the now Las Vegas Raiders signed Mabin to a reserve/futures contract on January 6, 2020. He was waived at the end of the preseason on September 5, 2020, but was re-signed to the practice squad the following day. Mabin was elevated to the Raiders active roster on October 24 for week 7 and made his NFL debut the following day in a 45–20 loss to the Tampa Bay Buccaneers. He reverted to the practice squad after the game.

Minnesota Vikings
On November 6, 2020, Mabin was signed by the Minnesota Vikings off the Raiders practice squad. He was waived on August 22, 2021.

New Orleans Saints
On September 6, 2021, Mabin was signed to the New Orleans Saints practice squad. He signed a reserve/future contract with the Saints on January 11, 2022. He was waived/injured on August 8, 2022, and was placed on injured reserve the next day. He was waived off injured reserve on August 12, 2022.

Atlanta Falcons
On September 13, 2022, Mabin was signed to the Atlanta Falcons practice squad. He signed a reserve/future contract on January 9, 2023.

References

External links
Fordham Rams Bio
Las Vegas Raiders Bio

Living people
1997 births
American football defensive backs
Atlanta Falcons players
Fordham Rams football players
Las Vegas Raiders players
Minnesota Vikings players
New Orleans Saints players
Oakland Raiders players
People from Macedonia, Ohio
Players of American football from Ohio